Unknown Worlds may refer to:

Unknown Worlds, an alternate title for Unknown, a 1940s pulp magazine
Unknown Worlds of Science Fiction, a 1970s comics magazine
Unknown Worlds: Tales from Beyond, a 1989 short story collection
Unknown Worlds Entertainment, a video game developer